Trypeta arcifera is a species of tephritid or fruit flies in the genus Trypeta of the family Tephritidae.

Distribution
Myanmar.

References

arcifera
Insects described in 1938
Diptera of Asia